The Emporia Downtown Historic District is a historic district which was listed on the National Register of Historic Places in 2012.

The district covers about 18 city blocks.  Its  listed area included 115 contributing buildings and 52 non-contributing buildings.  Two already-listed resources were included.

It includes a number of two- and three-story Italianate-style buildings from the 1860s, built soon after Emporia was founded in 1857.

References

Historic districts on the National Register of Historic Places in Kansas
Lyon County, Kansas